Cameron Treloar was an Australian rugby union player for Union Bordeaux Bègles in the Top 14.

Career

Cameron Treloar began his career with the New South Wales Waratahs in the Super 14 competition in 2005 before moving to the Queensland Reds in 2006. In 2007, he captained the Central Coast Rays in the inaugural Australian Rugby Championship (ARC), winning the competition the only time it was played. At the end of the 2007 Super 14 season he left to play for the Italian club Calvisano in the Super 10 winning the Italian Championship in 2008.

He stayed there for two years and then signed with I Cavalieri Prato in 2009. At the end of the season he went on to sign with Aviron Bayonnais in the Top 14. In January 2011, after playing 10 matches Treloar was traded to Union Bordeaux Bègles in the Pro D2. Deciding to terminate his contract with Aviron he went on to sign a contract with Bordeaux for one and a half years. In 2011 Union Bordeaux Bègles won the 2010–11 Rugby Pro D2 season final promoting them to the Top 14. In 2012, he resigned with Bordeaux for a further 2 years, until he retired from professional rugby.

Treloar played for NSW Country Eagles in the 2014 National Rugby Championship (NRC), finishing runners up to  Brisbane City, and then with the North Harbour Ray's in 2015.

In 2017, Treloar played with the Warringah Rats, winning the  Shute Shield prior to moving into  coaching.

References

Living people
1980 births
People from Cooma
Australian sportspeople of Tongan descent
Australian expatriate rugby union players
Expatriate rugby union players in Italy
Expatriate rugby union players in France
Australian expatriate sportspeople in Italy
Australian expatriate sportspeople in France
Queensland Reds players
New South Wales Waratahs players
Rugby union locks
Rugby union players from New South Wales